The Lover (Spanish: El Enamorado, alternately known as Vuelve Martin Corona) is a 1952 Mexican comedy western film directed by Miguel Zacarías and starring Pedro Infante, Sara Montiel and Eulalio González. It is a sequel to Here Comes Martin Corona.

Cast 
 Pedro Infante as Martín Corona  
 Sara Montiel as Rosario  
 Eulalio González as Piporro  
 Armando Silvestre as Emeterio
 Florencio Castelló as Serafín Delgado
 José Pulido as Diego
 Irma Dorantes as Gloria
 Armando Sáenz as Tomás
 Ángel Infante as Nacho
 Guillermo Calles as Cuervo
 Fanny Schiller as Anfitriona fiesta
 Julio Ahuet
 Salvador Quiroz
 José Alfredo Jiménez
 Blanca Marroquín
 Armando Velasco 
 Antonio R. Frausto as the doctor
 Marcela Zacarias
 Antonio Bribiesca
 Elisa Zacarias
 Mariachi Vargas

References

External links 
 
 

1952 comedy films
1950s Spanish-language films